The G1/S transition is a stage in the cell cycle at the boundary between the G1 phase, in which the cell grows, and the S phase, during which DNA is replicated. It is governed by cell cycle checkpoints to ensure cell cycle integrity and the subsequent S phase can pause in response to improperly or partially replicated DNA. During this transition the cell makes decisions to become quiescent (enter G0), differentiate, make DNA repairs, or proliferate based on environmental cues and molecular signaling inputs. The G1/S transition occurs late in G1 and the absence or improper application of this highly regulated check point can lead to cellular transformation and disease states such as cancer

During this transition, G1 cyclin D-Cdk4/6 dimer phosphorylates retinoblastoma releasing transcription factor E2F, which then drives the transition from G1 to S phase. The G1/S transition is highly regulated by transcription factor p53 in order to halt the cell cycle when DNA is damaged.

It is a "point of no return" beyond which the cell is committed to dividing; in yeast this is called START and in multicellular eukaryotes it is termed the restriction point (R-Point). If a cell passes through the G1/S transition the cell will continue through the cell cycle regardless of incoming mitogenic factors due to the positive feed-back loop of G1-S transcription. Positive feed-back loops include G1 cyclins and accumulation of E2F.

Cell cycle overview
The cell cycle is a process in which an ordered set of events leads to the growth and division into two daughter cells. The cell cycle is a cycle rather than a linear process because the two daughter cells produced repeat the cycle. This process contains two main phases, interphase, in which the cell grows and synthesizes a copy of its DNA, and the mitotic (M) phase, during which the cell separates its DNA and divides into two new daughter cells. Interphase is further broken down into the G1 (GAP 1) phase, S (Synthesis) phase, G2 (GAP 2) phase and the mitotic (M) phase which in turn is broken down into mitosis and cytokinesis.  Following cytokinesis, during G1 phase the cells monitor environment for the potential growth factors, grow larger and once achieve the threshold size (rRNA and overall protein content characteristic for a given cell type) they start progression through S phase. During S phase, the cell also duplicates the centrosome, or microtubule-organizing center, which is critical for DNA separation in the M phase. After complete synthesis of its DNA, the cell enters the G2 phase where it continues to grow in preparation for mitosis. Following interphase, the cell transitions into mitosis, containing four sub stages: prophase, anaphase, metaphase, and telophase. In mitosis, DNA condenses into chromosomes, which are lined up and separated by the mitotic spindle. After duplicate DNA is separated on opposite ends of the cell, the cytoplasm of the cell is split in two during cytokinesis resulting in two daughter cells.

Cell cycle regulation
As with most processes in the body, the cell cycle is highly regulated to prevent the synthesis of mutated cells and uncontrolled cell division that leads to tumor formation. The cell cycle control system is biochemically based so that the proteins of the mitosis promoting factor (MPF) control the transition from one phase to the next based on a series of checkpoints. MPF is a protein dimer made up of cyclin and cyclin-dependent kinase (Cdk), a serine and threonine kinase, which come together at different points in the cycle to control cell progression through the cycle. When cyclin binds to Cdk, Cdk becomes activated and phosphorylates serine and threonine on other proteins causing the activation and degradation of other proteins allowing the cell to transition through the cell cycle.

G1/transition
In mid to late G1 phase, cyclin D bound to Cdk4/6, activates the expression of the S phase cyclin-Cdk components; however, the cell does not want S phase cyclins to become active in G1. Therefore, an inhibitor, protein Slc-1, is present that interacts with the dimer so that the S phase cyclin-Cdk dimer remains inactive until the cell is ready to move into S phase. After the cell has grown and is ready to synthesize DNA, G1 cyclin-Cdks phosphorylate the S phase cyclin inhibitor signaling ubiquitination, resulting in the addition of groups to the inhibitor. Ubiquitination of the inhibitor signals the SCF/proteasome to degrade the inhibitor releasing and allowing the S phase cyclin-Cdk to become activated and the cell moves into S phase. Once in S phase, cyclin-Cdks phosphorylate several factors on the replication complex promoting DNA replication by causing inhibitory proteins to fall off of replication complexes or through activation of components on the replication complex to induce DNA replication initiation.

Retinoblastoma protein (pRB) and the G1/S transition

Another dimer present during mid G1 is composed of retinoblastoma protein (pRB) and transcription factor E2F. When pRb is bound to E2F, E2F is inactive. As cyclin D is synthesized and activates Cdk4/6, the cyclin-Cdk targets Rb protein for phosphorylation. Upon phosphorylation, pRb changes conformation so that E2F is released and activated, binding to upstream regions of genes, initiating expression. Specifically, E2F drives the expression of other cyclins, including cyclin E and A, and genes necessary for DNA replication. Cyclin E either phosphorylates more pRb to further activate E2F and promote the expression of more Cyclin E, or it has the ability to increase expression of itself. Cyclin E also interacts with Cdk2 driving the cell cycle to progress from G1 to S phase.

The role of retinoblastoma in tumor formation
Retinoblastoma (Rb) is a cancer of the eye due to a mutant pRb protein. When pRb is mutated it becomes nonfunctional and is not able to inhibit the expression of transcription factor E2F. Therefore, E2F is always active and driving the cell cycle to progress from G1 to S phase. As a result, cell growth and division is unregulated causing tumor formation in the eye.

Cell cycle checkpoints
To ensure proper cell division, the cell cycle utilizes numerous checkpoints to monitor cell progression and halt the cycle when processes go awry. These checkpoints include four DNA damage checkpoints, one unreplicated DNA checkpoint at the end of G2, one spindle assembly checkpoint in mitosis, and a chromosome segregation checkpoint during mitosis.

p53 as a regulator

Between G1 and S phase, three DNA damage checkpoints occur to ensure proper growth and synthesis of DNA prior to cell division. Damaged DNA during G1, before entry into S phase, and during S phase result in the expression of ATM/R protein. ATM/R protein then stabilizes and activates transcription factor p53 so that it can bind to upstream regions of genes, inducing the expression of proteins including p21CIP. p21CIP binds to and inhibits any cyclin-cdk present in the cell cycle, halting the cycle until DNA damage can be corrected.

Additional processes at DNA damage checkpoints
Of the four DNA damage checkpoints, two have an additional process for monitoring DNA damage other than activating p53. Before entry into S phase and during S phase, ATM/R also activates Chk1/2 that inhibits Cdc25A, a protein responsible for activating cyclin-Cdk dimers. Without cyclin dimer activation, the cell cannot transition through the cycle. These two checkpoints have additional processes for regulation because replicating damaged DNA in S phase can be deleterious to the cell and more importantly, the organism.

See also 
 Cell cycle
 G1 phase
 S phase
 S-phase promoting factor

References 

Cell cycle